Ole Christian Veiby is a professional rally driver from Norway driving for Hyundai Motorsport in the WRC-2 category of the World Rally Championship.

Racing record

Complete World Rally Championship results

Complete World Rally Championship-2 results

Complete FIA World Rallycross Championship results

Supercar/RX1e

Complete FIA European Rallycross Championship results

Supercar/RX1

References

Profile at Škoda Motorsport 
ewrc-results.com profile

Living people
Norwegian rally drivers
European Rallycross Championship drivers
World Rallycross Championship drivers
World Rally Championship drivers
1996 births
Sportspeople from Kongsvinger
Dreyer & Reinbold Racing drivers
Hyundai Motorsport drivers
24H Series drivers
Škoda Motorsport drivers